Natalie Novosel (born November 22, 1989) is an American professional basketball player. Born in Lexington, Kentucky, she went to Lexington Catholic High School and played collegiately for the Fighting Irish of Notre Dame.

USA Basketball
Novosel played on the team representing the US at the 2011 World University Games held in Shenzhen, China. The team, coached by Bill Fennelly, won all six games to earn the gold medal. Novosel averaged 4.5 points per game.

Notre Dame statistics

Source

WNBA
Novosel was selected in the first round of the 2012 WNBA Draft (8th overall) by the Washington Mystics, and was cut by the Mystics before the 2013 WNBA season.

Personal
Shortly after the draft, Novosel said that her first choice of teams was the Mystics, adding that she "couldn't be any happier" that the team selected her. She had personal reasons for wanting to play in Washington, most notably that her twin brother Nathan was set to begin a two-year position in the city with Teach for America in late summer 2012.

References

1989 births
Living people
American expatriate basketball people in Romania
American women's basketball players
Basketball players from Lexington, Kentucky
Club Sportiv Municipal Târgoviște players
Guards (basketball)
Lexington Catholic High School alumni
McDonald's High School All-Americans
Notre Dame Fighting Irish women's basketball players
Parade High School All-Americans (girls' basketball)
Sportswomen from Kentucky
American twins
Twin sportspeople
Universiade gold medalists for the United States
Universiade medalists in basketball
Washington Mystics draft picks
Washington Mystics players
Medalists at the 2011 Summer Universiade